The official language of Germany is German, with over 95 percent of the country speaking Standard German or a dialect of German as their first language. This figure includes speakers of Northern Low Saxon, a recognized minority or regional language that is not considered separately from Standard German in statistics. Recognized minority languages have official status as well, usually in their respective regions.

Language spoken at home 
Neither the 1987 West German census nor the 2011 census inquired about language. Starting with the 2017 microcensus (a survey with a sampling fraction of 1% of the persons and households in Germany that supplies basic sociodemographic data and facilitates ongoing monitoring of the labor market), a question asking, "Which language is spoken predominantly in your household?" was added, nearly eighty years since the 1939 Census asked for the mother tongue of the population.

According to a 2019 Pew Research survey, the most commonly spoken languages at home were:
 German (90% of households)
 Turkish (2% of households)
 Arabic (1% of households)
 Other (6% of households)

The questionnaire did not distinguish Standard German from German dialects.

German dialects 

The German language area is characterized by a range of different dialects. There is a written and spoken standard language but there are also large differences in the usage of the standard and the local dialects. The flight and expulsion of Germans broke down the isolation of dialect areas. In 1959, 20% of West Germans were expellees or refugees. The colloquial speech is a compromise between Standard German and the dialect. Northern Germany (the Low German area) is characterized by a loss of dialects: standard German is the vernacular, with very few regional features even in informal situations. In Central Germany (the Middle German area) there is a tendency towards dialect loss. In Southern Germany (the Upper German area) dialects are still in use. Dialects are declining in all regions except for Bavaria. In 2008, 45% of Bavarians claimed to use only Bavarian in everyday communication.

Minority languages
Recognized minority languages include:
 Romani (0.8%)
 Danish (0.06%)
 North Frisian (0.01%) and Saterland Frisian
 Upper Sorbian and Lower Sorbian (0.01%)

European Charter for Regional or Minority Languages 

Germany ratified the European Charter for Regional or Minority Languages on 16 September 1998 for the following languages in respect of specific Länder:

 Romani (across Germany)
 Danish (in Schleswig-Holstein)
 Low German (part III in Bremen, Hamburg, Mecklenburg-Vorpommern, Lower Saxony and Schleswig-Holstein); (part II in Brandenburg, Northrhine-Westphalia and Saxony-Anhalt)
 North Frisian (in Schleswig-Holstein)
 Saterland Frisian (in Lower Saxony)
 Upper Sorbian (in the Free State of Saxony)
 Lower Sorbian (in Brandenburg)

Immigrant languages

Immigrant languages spoken by sizable communities of first and second-generation (dominant origin of the speakers in brackets):
Turkish (southern Europe and Western Asia) c. 1.8%
Kurdish (Western Asia) c. 0.3%
Tamil (South Asia and Southeast Asia)
Russian (eastern Europe and Northern Asia) c. 2.6%
Arabic (Western Asia and North Africa)
Greek (southern Europe)
Dutch (Western Europe)
Polish (central Europe)
Serbo-Croatian (Western Balkans, southern Europe)
Italian (southern Europe)
Portuguese (southern Europe)

Second languages
Most Germans learn English as their first foreign language at school. However, in some cases, French or Latin are taught first; French and Latin are also common second or third foreign languages. Russian, Italian, Spanish, Polish, Dutch, Classical Greek, and other languages are also offered in schools, depending on the school's geographic location and available resources.

During the existence of the German Democratic Republic (East Germany), the most common second language taught there was Russian, while English and French were the preferred second languages taught in schools in the Federal Republic of Germany (West Germany).

However, the English of German schoolchildren is generally not as good as that of their peers in Scandinavian countries.

Several bilingual kindergartens and schools exist in Germany offering education in German and English, French, Spanish, Japanese, Turkish, and other languages.

See also 

 Bavarian language
 Alemannic German
 Limburgish
 Meuse-Rhenish
 Luxembourgish
 Ripuarian language

References

 
German language
German culture